Ezzedine Salim, also known as Abdelzahra Othman Mohammed (23 March 1943 – 17 May 2004, عبد الزهراء عثمان محمد), was an Iraqi politician, author, educator, Islamist theorist and one of the leading members of the Iraqi Dawaa Movement between 1980 and 2004. He served as the President of the Governing Council of Iraq (45th Prime Minister of Iraq) in 2004.

Author of over 50 books, including history, Islamic events and works on education, he is best known in the Muslim world for his work on what he believed to be the social and political role of Islam, particularly in his book Political Opposition in the experience of Imam Ali(as). His magnum opus, Fatima Bint Muhammad, is a high calibre commentary on the life of Fatima, the daughter of Islamic prophet, Muhammad.

Biography

Born in the city of Basra, Salim began studying religion and politics at a young age. At the age of 19 he joined the Shiite group Islamic Dawa Party, whose members were quickly noticed by the Baath Party as a threat to their power. He left Iraq in his early twenties to go and live in Kuwait.

After a short time in Kuwait, he went to Iran where he began his career as an editor in many newspapers as well as his main job in the SCIRI (Supreme Council for the Islamic Revolution in Iraq). During his stay in Iran, he gained recognition as a Mujtahid (a high-ranking Islamic scholar). He wrote over 100 books covering topics ranging from religion to politics.

Salim headed the Daawa al-Islamiyah ("Invitation to Islam") party, an Islamist party officially being referred to (in 2004) as Daawa Islamic Party. Known as a writer, philosopher, thinker and political activist, he started his political party as a vehicle to coordinate opposition against Saddam Hussein. The party was quickly recognized as a strong anti-Saddam group. It gained many supporters over the years, and became respected not only in Iraq, Iran and the Middle East but throughout the world. Salim survived numerous assassination attempts by Saddam's followers, and deliberately changed his name to avoid being tracked.

In July 2003, Salim was given a position on the Iraqi Governing Council by the U.S.-led Coalition Provisional Authority, where he was serving as a crucial member.  At a "town hall" meeting with press and public, April 25, 2004, he was asked whether Iraq could retain its identity as an Arab nation under a democracy. Ezzedine Salim responded, “Iraq is a member of the Arab League, but all are represented here now, including Turkmen, Kurds and Christians for example. Iraq is full of diversity.”

He became president of the Council on May 1, 2004. Ezzedine Salim was to serve as Council President until the formal handover of power to a new government on June 30. However, he was killed by a suicide car bomb near the Green Zone on May 17, 2004. Jama'at al-Tawhid wal-Jihad claimed responsibility.

References

External links
Official website
Memorial website
Izzedin Salim Politically skilful Shia leader recently appointed president of the Iraqi Governing Council
Izzedin Salim Moderate Shia leader trying to balance religion and politics in Iraq

1943 births
2004 deaths
Assassinated Iraqi politicians
Deaths by car bomb in Iraq
Iraqi Shia Muslims
Iraqi terrorism victims
People from Basra
Terrorism deaths in Iraq
Islamic Dawa Party politicians